The Kekerengu River (often spelt Kekerangu) is a river of New Zealand's northeastern South Island. It flows mainly through the area of rough hill country immediately to the north of the end of the Seaward Kaikōura Range, reaching the Pacific Ocean at Kekerengu, a small settlement halfway between the township of Ward and the mouth of the Waiau Toa / Clarence River.

See also
List of rivers of New Zealand

References

External links 

 1947 aerial photo of estuary, bridges and settlement

Rivers of New Zealand
Rivers of Canterbury, New Zealand